Searby is both a surname and a given name. Notable people with the name include:

John Searby (1900–1956), English cricketer
Richard Searby (1931–2018), Australian lawyer
Robin Searby (born 1947), British military officer
Searby Buxton (1832-1919), New Zealand politician

See also
Searby, Lincolnshire, village in England